The 2007–08 Illinois State Redbirds men's basketball team represented Illinois State University during the 2007–08 NCAA Division I men's basketball season. The Redbirds, led by first year head coach Tim Jankovich, played their home games at Doug Collins Court at Redbird Arena and were a member of the Missouri Valley Conference.

The Redbirds finished the season 25–10, 13–5 in conference play to finish in second place. They were the number two seed for the Missouri Valley Conference tournament. They won their quarterfinal game versus Missouri State University and semifinal game versus the University of Northern Iowa but lost their final game versus Drake University.

The Redbirds received an at-large bid to the 2008 National Invitation Tournament and were assigned the number two seed in the Ohio State University regional. They were victorious over Utah State University in the first round and were defeated by Dayton University in the second round.

Roster

Schedule

|-
!colspan=9 style=|Exhibition Season

|-
!colspan=9 style=|Regular Season

|-
!colspan=9 style=|State FarmMissouri Valley Conference {MVC} tournament

|-
!colspan=9 style=|MasterCardNational Invitation {NIT} tournament

References

Illinois State Redbirds men's basketball seasons
Illinois State
Illinois State